The East Twin  River is a stream on the Olympic Peninsula in the U.S. state of Washington. It originates in the northern Olympic Mountains and flows north, emptying into the Strait of Juan de Fuca just east of West Twin River.

Course
The East Twin River originates in the Olympic National Forest on the north slope of Mount Muller, on the northern portion of Olympic Peninsula.

See also
 List of rivers of Washington

References

Rivers of Washington (state)
Rivers of Clallam County, Washington